Rosenquist is a Swedish surname meaning "rose branch". Notable people with the surname include:

Gustaf Rosenquist (1887–1961), Swedish gymnast
James Rosenquist (1933–2017), American artist
Jesse Rosenquist (1899–1966), American police radio dispatcher pioneer
Alan Rosenquist (1983–present), American Maritime Technologist

See also
Rosenqvist

References

Swedish-language surnames